Fermitin family homolog 1 is a protein that in humans is encoded by the FERMT1 gene.

References

External links
 FERMT1 Info with links in the Cell Migration Gateway

Further reading